Deyan Audio is one of the world's largest independent producers of audiobooks, having produced in excess of 12,000 titles. The company, based in southern California, was founded in 1990 by Bob and Debra Deyan.

Deyan Audio works with publishers including: Penguin Random House, HarperCollins, Hachette, Scholastic, Macmillan, Pearson Educational, Simon & Schuster, Houghton Mifflin Harcourt, Listening Library, McGraw Hill, Audible and many others. They handle all aspects of production, including casting and directing for thousands of audiobooks. Deyan Audio hires from a list of over 1500 actors.

The company owns 9 recording booths and employs 102 editors and engineers, and 30 directors. In 2014 the company created two additional businesses; Game Changer Studios and The Deyan Institute of Voice Artistry and Technology.

Branches
The company operates Game Changer Studios out of its Northridge location. Game Changer is a production studio specializing in ADR, video game production, interactive toy production, voiceover and dubbing. Game Changer clients include Weston Woods, LeapFrog, Mattel, Insatiable Press, Audible, etc.

The Deyan Institute for Voice Artistry and Technology, also operates out of the Northridge location. The Institute began offering classes in April 2014 in audiobook performance, direction, production, voiceover and editing.

Corporate History
Deyan Audio was started by Bob and Debra Deyan. The company started in their home in Van Nuys, California in 1990, doing their first recordings in a clothes closet. The company grew and moved to a larger location in Tarzana California in 2007. They expanded again in 2013, adding their Northridge location.

Awards
Deyan Audio has won four Grammy Awards and been nominated eleven times, in addition to numerous Audie Awards, ListenUp, Benjamin Franklin, and Earphone Awards.

Bob and Debra Deyan won the Lifetime Achievement Award in 2013 from the Audio Publishers Association, for their work in helping to pioneer the audiobook industry.

References

External links
Deyan Audio, official website
Deyan Institute of Vocal Artistry and Technology, official website

1990 establishments in California
Audiobook companies and organizations